Eurysaccoides is a genus of moths in the family Gelechiidae.

Species
 Eurysaccoides alternatus Povolný, 1998
 Eurysaccoides gallaespinosae Povolný, 1998

References

Gnorimoschemini